ZBM may refer to:

 Bromont (Roland Désourdy) Airport in Quebec, Canada (IATA code)
 ZBM-TV, a Bermuda CBS affiliate owned by Bermuda Broadcasting